Peel Session is a release by electronic duo Autechre, released on vinyl and CD by Warp Records on 11 January 1999. It consists of material recorded for John Peel's Radio 1 sessions in late 1995. The session was first broadcast on 13 October 1995.

The sleeve is designed by Sheffield-based design agency The Designers Republic.

"Drane" was selected by Warp Records co-founder Steve Beckett as one of his 14 absolute favourite tracks from the Warp catalogue for the Warp20 (Chosen) compilation.

Track listing

References

External links
 Peel Session at the Warp Records official website

1999 EPs
Autechre
Live EPs
Autechre EPs
1999 live albums
Warp (record label) live albums
Warp (record label) EPs
Albums with cover art by The Designers Republic